The House of Burgh or Burke was an ancient Anglo-Norman and later Hiberno-Norman aristocratic dynasty (with the Anglo-Irish branches later adopting the surname Burke and its variants) who held the earldoms of Kent, Ulster, Clanricarde, and Mayo at various times, provided one Queen Consort of Scotland and multiples other royals, and played a prominent role in the Norman invasion of Ireland.

The surname de Burgh derives from the English village of Burgh-next-Aylsham, Norfolk or Burgh, Suffolk. The name is of Old English origin and means ‘fortified town’. The first of the de Burgh family to settle in Ireland was the Anglo-Norman adventurer, William de Burgh (c. 1160–1205/6), who arrived in 1185 with Henry II of England. He was the elder brother of Hubert de Burgh, who was Earl of Kent and Justiciar of England (and believed to be the ancestor of the Lords Burgh).

William de Burgh founded the Irish line of the family which included the Lords of Connaught, Earls of Ulster and Earls of Clanricarde. After the fourteenth century, some branches of the Irish line 
gaelicised the surname in Irish as de Búrca which gradually became Búrc then later Burke or Bourke, and this surname has been associated with Connaught for more than seven centuries. Later, some branches returned to their original surname of 'de Burgh' in the late nineteenth century most notably the Earls and Marquesses of Clanricarde).

William de Burgh's great-great-granddaughter, Elizabeth de Burgh, daughter of Richard Óg de Burgh, 2nd Earl of Ulster, married Robert the Bruce (later King Robert I of Scots) and became Queen Consort of Scotland. Another descendant, Elizabeth de Burgh, 4th Countess of Ulster, was the wife of Edward III's son Lionel of Antwerp, 1st Duke of Clarence, from whom the Yorkist Plantagenets later derived their claim to the throne of England.

In England, one branch of the family (Lords Burgh) changed the name to 'Burgh' at some time after the Civil War in the seventeenth century (the 'de' having been removed to hide the family's connection to the nobility and Catholicism).

The de Burgh/Burke family has include many prominent figures during the Middle Ages, Crusades, British Empire, World War I and World War II.

Family History

The earliest documented generation of the family was represented in the late 12th and early 13th centuries by three brothers, William de Burgh (who played a major role in the Anglo-Norman invasion of Ireland), Hubert de Burgh (who, as Chief Justiciar of England and Ireland, was created Earl of Kent), and Geoffrey de Burgh (who became Bishop of Ely).  The Kent Earldom became extinct on Hubert's death, and his family passed into relative obscurity until one line (Baron Burgh) was ennobled in the later 15th/early sixteenth century. William gave rise to one of the most prominent Anglo-Irish families of the later Middle Ages.

Descendant of Hubert de Burgh, Earl of Kent (d. before 1243)
The grant of the Earldom of Kent to Hubert was limited to himself and any male heirs born to his final wife, Princess Margaret of Scotland, but their only child was a daughter who was herself childless. Hubert's sons, John and Hubert, inherited his lands, the latter thought to be ancestor Thomas Burgh of Gainsborough, Lincolnshire, who in 1487 was summoned to Parliament as Baron Burgh (or Borough) of Gainsborough. Thomas, 3rd Baron was Lord Deputy of Ireland (1597), and his younger brother, Sir John (d. 1594), was a distinguished soldier and sailor. The 6th Baron died as a young child in 1602, and the barony fell into abeyance among four his sisters.

Descendants of William de Burgh (d. 1206)

William de Burgh (d. 1206) received a grant of lands from King John (1189). At John's accession (1199) he was installed in Thomond and became Governor of Limerick. Between 1199 and 1201 he was supporting, in turn, Cathal Carrach and Cathal Crovderg for the native throne, but William was expelled from Limerick (1203) and, lost his Connaught (though not Munster) estates. William married a daughter of Domnall Mór Ó Briain (O'Brien), King of Thomond, King of Limerick, and claimant to the Kingdom of Munster (a descendant of Brian Boru and the O'Brien dynasty).

Lords of Connaught
William's son, Richard Mór de Burgh, 1st Lord of Connaught (d. 1243), received the land of "Connok" (Connaught) as forfeited by its king, whom he helped to fight (1227). He was Justiciar of Ireland (1228–32). In 1234, he sided with the crown against Richard, Earl Marshal, who fell in battle against him. Richard Mór's eldest son, Sir Richard de Burgh (d. 1248) succeeded him, briefly, as Lord of Connaught.

Earls of Ulster 

Richard Mór's second son, Walter de Burgh (d. 1271), continued warfare against the native chieftains and added greatly to his vast domains by obtaining, from Prince Edward, a grant of "the county of Ulster" (c. 1255) in consequence of which he was styled later Earl of Ulster.

Walter, 1st Earl of Ulster was succeeded by his son, Richard Óg de Burgh, 2nd Earl of Ulster. In 1286, he ravaged and subdued Connaught, and deposed the chief native king (Bryan O'Neill), substituting how own nominee. He also attacked the native king of Connaught, in favour of that branch of the O'Conors whom his own family supported. He led his forces from Ireland to support Edward I in his Scottish campaigns, and on Edward Bruce's invasion of Ulster (1315), Richard marched against him, but had given his daughter, Elizabeth, in marriage (c. 1304) to Robert Bruce (afterwards Robert I, King of Scots). Occasionally summoned to English parliaments, he spent most of his forty years of activity in Ireland, where he was the greatest noble of his day, usually fighting the natives or his Anglo-Norman rivals. The patent roll of 1290 shows that in addition to his lands in Ulster, Connaught and Munster, he held the Isle of Man, but later surrendered it to the king.

Richard, 2nd Earl's grandson and successor was William Donn de Burgh, 3rd Earl of Ulster (d. 1333), son of John de Burgh (d. 1313) and Elizabeth, Lady of Clare (d. 1360), sister and co-heir of the last Clare Earl of Hertford (d. 1314). William Donn married Maud of Lancaster (daughter of Henry, 3rd Earl of Lancaster) and was appointed Lieutenant of Ireland (1331), but was murdered in his 21st year, leaving his only daughter, Elizabeth de Burgh, as the sole heiress not only of the de Burgh possessions but of the vast Clare estates. She was married in childhood to Lionel, 1st Duke of Clarence (third son of Edward III) who was recognized in her right as Earl of Ulster from whom the Yorkist Plantagenets later derived their claim to the throne of England. Their descendant, Edward, 4th Duke of York, ascended the throne in 1461 as Edward IV, since when the Earldom of Ulster has been only held by members of the British Royal Family.

Burke Civil War (1333–38)

On the murder of William Donn de Burgh, 3rd Earl of Ulster (1333), his male kinsmen (who had a better right to the succession than his daughter, according to native Irish ideas), adopting Irish names and customs, became virtually native chieftains and succeeded in holding the bulk of the de Burgh territories.

Their two main branches were those of Mac William Uachtar (Upper Mac William) or Clanricarde (in southern Connacht and Galway) and Mac William Íochtar (Lower Mac William) in northern Connacht (Mayo).

Burke/de Burgh of Mac William Uachtar (Earls and Marquesses of Clanricarde)

In 1543, the Mac William Uachtar (Upper Mac William) chief, as Ulick na gCeann "Bourck, alias Makwilliam" surrendered it to Henry VIII, receiving it back to hold, by English custom, as Earl of Clanricarde and Lord Dunkellin (1543).

His descendant, Richard Burke, 4th Earl of Clanricarde distinguished himself on the English side in O'Neill's Rebellion and afterwards obtained the English Earldom of St Albans (1628). His son, Ulick Burke, received the Irish Marquessate of Clanricarde (first creation, 1646). His cousin and heir, Richard Burke, 6th Earl of Clanricarde was uncle of Richard Burke, 8th Earl and John Burke, 9th Earl, both of whom fought for James II and paid the penalty for doing so (1691), but the latter was restored (1702), and his great-grandson, Henry de Burgh, 12th Earl, was created Marquess of Clanricarde (second creation, 1789).

He left no son, but his brother, John de Burgh, 13th Earl was created Earl of Clanricarde (second creation, 1800) and the Marquessate was later revived (1825), for John's son, Ulick de Burgh, 14th and 2nd Earl His heir, Hubert de Burgh-Canning was the 2nd and last Marquess. The Earldom of Clanricarde (second creation) passed by special remainder to the 6th Marquess of Sligo. This family, which changed its name from Burke to de Burgh (1752) and added that of Canning (1862), owned a vast estate in County Galway.

Bourke of Mac William Íochtar (Viscounts Mayo and Earls of Mayo)

Seaán mac Oliver Bourke, 17th Lord of Mac William Íochtar was created Baron Ardenerie in 1580. Tibbot (Theobald) MacWalter Kittagh Bourke, 21st Lord of Mac William Íochtar, fled to Spain where he was created Marquess of Mayo (1602) in the Spanish peerage.

In 1603, the 19th Lord of Mac William Íochtar, Tiobóid na Long (Theobald) Bourke (d. 1629), resigned his territory in Mayo, and received it back to hold by English tenure and was later created Viscount Mayo (1627). Miles, 2nd Viscount (d. 1649) and Theobald, 3rd Viscount (d. 1652) suffered at Cromwell's hands, but Theobald, 4th Viscount was restored to his estates (some 50,000 acres) in 1666. The peerage became extinct or dormant on the death of John, 8th Viscount (1767).

In 1781, a Mayo man believed to be descended from the line of Mac William Íochtar, John Bourke, was created Viscount Mayo (1781) and later Earl of Mayo (1785). Richard Bourke, 6th Earl of Mayo was appointed Viceroy of India in 1869 and was murdered in the Andaman Islands in 1872. His younger brother was the politician Robert Bourke, 1st Baron Connemara who was appointed Governor of Madras.

The baronies of Bourke of Castleconnell (1580) and Bourke of Brittas (1618), both forfeited in 1691, were bestowed on branches of the family which still has representatives in the baronetage and landed gentry of Ireland.

Arms (Heraldry)

The original de Burgh coat of arms is blazoned as Or, a cross gules (a red cross on a gold shield).

Variations on this original shield were adopted by different branches of the family. For instance, the arms of the Burke/de Burgh family of Clanricarde added a black lion to the upper-left quadrant (Or, a cross gules in the first quarter a lion rampant sable). Another Burke family added a fleur-de-llys to the cross (Or, on a cross gules a fleur-de-llys of the first), and the arms of the Burkes or Bourkes, Viscounts Mayo, was Party per fess Or and Ermine, a cross gules the first quarter charged with a lion rampant sable and the second with a dexter hand couped at the wrist and erect gules.

The crest, a seated and chained 'mountain cat', is said to represent liberty and courage and is believed to be awarded for a de Burgh's courage and skill in battle during the Crusades.

The motto has varied between A cruce Salus (Latin: 'salvation from the cross'), which would have originated in the Crusades, and un roy, une foy, une loy (archaic French: 'one king, one faith, one law'), originating when the family moved to Ireland.

Genealogy

See also 
Irish nobility
The Book of the Burkes or Book of the de Burgos (1580s), Gaelic illuminated manuscript at Trinity College Dublin
 William de Burgh, founder of the House of Burgh
 Richard Mór de Burgh, first lord of Connacht
Viscount Galway, viscountcy created in the Peerage of Ireland in 1628 and 1687
Baron Leitrim, barony created in the Peerage of Ireland
Burke Baronets of Glinsk and Marble Hill, Galway, created in the Baronetage of Ireland in 1628 and 1797
 Mac William Uachtar/Clanricarde, the Burke clan of Galway
 Mac William Íochtar, the Bourke clan of Mayo
Burke's Peerage, British account of nobility and genealogical publisher, first published in 1826 by John Burke
Burke's Landed Gentry, British account of families of the land-holding class, first published in 1833 by John Burke
 Herluin de Conteville, stepfather of William the Conqueror, ancestor of the de Burghs
Edmund Burke (1729–1797), Irish statesman, economist, and philosopher
De Burgh (surname), list of people with this surname
Burke (surname), list of people with this surname
Bourke (surname), list of people with this surname

Sources

References

External links
 

Noble families in the British Isles
Anglo-Norman families
Anglo-Norman Irish dynasties
Lordship of Ireland
House of Burgh
Roman Catholic families
Irish people of Norman descent
Normans in Ireland
Dynasties of Ireland
European dynasties
Irish noble families
Irish nobility
Medieval Irish nobility
Irish families